5-azacytidine-induced protein 2 is a protein that in humans is encoded by the AZI2 gene.

AZI2, or NAP1, contributes to the activation of NFKB (see MIM 164011)-dependent gene expression by activating IKK-related kinases, such as NAK (TBK1; MIM 604834) (Fujita et al., 2003).[supplied by OMIM]

References

External links

Further reading